Udon United Football Club (Thai สโมสรฟุตบอล อุดร ยูไนเต็ด), is a Thai professional football club based in Mueang, Udon Thani, Thailand. The club is currently playing in the Thai League 3 Northeastern region.

History
In 2018, the club was established as Nong Han and competed in Thailand Amateur League Northeastern region, used Nongbua Lamphu Provincial Stadium as ground. In the 2018 season, the club used the players from the Pitchaya Bundit college to compete in the amateur league. They competed in the amateur league to the 2018 and 2019 seasons continuously.

In 2020, the club was promoted to Thai League 3 or also known as Omsin League. Due to the resurgence of COVID-19 pandemic in Thailand, the FA Thailand must abruptly end the regional stage of the Thai League 3. The club finished the 1st place of the Northeastern region and could advanced to 2020–21 Thai League 3 National Championship. Udon United finished 2nd place in the upper group advanced to the promotion play-off but they were defeated to Rajpracha. However, Jardel Capistrano, a player with Udon United was the topscorer of the Thai League 3 in 2020–21 season.

Stadium and locations

Season by season record

P = Played
W = Games won
D = Games drawn
L = Games lost
F = Goals for
A = Goals against
Pts = Points
Pos = Final position

QR1 = First Qualifying Round
QR2 = Second Qualifying Round
R1 = Round 1
R2 = Round 2
R3 = Round 3
R4 = Round 4

R5 = Round 5
R6 = Round 6
QF = Quarter-finals
SF = Semi-finals
RU = Runners-up
W = Winners

Players

Current squad

}

Club officials

References

Association football clubs established in 2018
Football clubs in Thailand
Udon Thani province
2018 establishments in Thailand